José Ramón Eizmendi Urdangarín (born 29 August 1960 in Ikaztegieta, Gipuzkoa) is a Spanish retired football midfielder and manager. His brother Francisco and nephews Alain and Eneko were also footballers.

References

External links

1960 births
Living people
People from Tolosaldea
Sportspeople from Gipuzkoa
Spanish footballers
Footballers from the Basque Country (autonomous community)
Association football midfielders
La Liga players
Segunda División players
Segunda División B players
Tercera División players
Real Sociedad B footballers
Real Sociedad footballers
CD Tenerife players
Real Oviedo players
Xerez CD footballers
SD Beasain footballers
Spanish football managers
Segunda División managers
Segunda División B managers
Real Unión managers
Real Sociedad B managers
Real Sociedad managers
Real Sociedad non-playing staff